West End Eurovision is an annual fundraising event held in London between top West End shows, loosely based on the Eurovision Song Contest. It is generally held at the Piccadilly theatre and the host show does not compete but rather is the opening act before the main event. This event is done for the charity The Make A Difference Trust and the format is divided between three competitions, one for the best performance, one for best creativity and another for the best video ident.
Each year a number of celebrity judges pick the winner of the Best Creative Award, while the Best Video Ident Award is chosen over social media. 
The Best Performance Award is the biggest of the three and is awarded to the performance that gets the highest number of points combined from three categories: the best video ident points, phone votes from the audience (which are doubled) and points from the show representatives from each competing show.

2008 
Debuting Shows:
Avenue Q
Buddy
The Lion King
Phantom of the Opera
Mamma Mia!
Grease
Wicked

2009

2010 

This year's contest was judged by Toby Anstis, Sally Ann Triplet and Graham Norton

2011 

This year, the contest panelists were Legally Blonde leading lady Sheridan Smith, BBC Eurovision commentator Graham Norton and unsuccessful 2010 Irish Eurovision contestant Justin Lee Collins

2012 

The celebrity judges this year were Kerry Ellis, Tony Blackburn and Stefanie Powers
Points are shown as follows: (Video ident points, Show judges points, Phone votes from the audience) = TOTAL

2013

References

West End theatre
Theatre in London